Leonard Owen-John (1 May 1918 – 23 January 1995) was a Welsh author of spy fiction who is mostly remembered for his series of novels starring the Russian-born MI-6 agent Haggai Godin.

Praised by his comparatively realistic approach to the world of espionage, he has been called by critics "a master of the double cross".

Bibliography

Haggai Godin series
These novels star Haggai Godin, a hard-boiled, bon vivant MI-6 agent of Russian ancestry, who is frequently paired with Colonel Charles Mason of the CIA. Each novel is set in a different country. 
 
Thirty Days Hath September (1966)
The Disinformer (1966)
A Beam of Black Light (1968)
Dead on Time (1969)
The Shadow in the Sea (1972)
Sabotage (1973)
Getaway (1976)

Other works
Computer Takes All (1967, as John Bourne)
The Diamond Dress (1970) 	
The Controller (1978) 	
Festival (1978)	
McGreogor's Island (1979)

References

Sources

External links
 Owen John on Classiccrimefiction.com
 

1918 births
1995 deaths
Welsh writers
Welsh novelists
British spy fiction writers